Downwash Ditch is a  long river (brook) and drainage ditch of the Pevensey Levels in the civil parish of Hailsham, Wealden District of East Sussex, England. Rising in the Honeycrocks, Downwash Ditch flows a westerly course into Winters Cut, giving rise to a stream of Saltmarsh Sewer just north of the Westham civil parish.

References 

Rivers of East Sussex
Rivers of the Pevensey Levels